The Church of the Good Shepherd is a Roman Catholic church in Woodthorpe, Nottinghamshire. It is a Grade II* listed building.

History
The church was opened on 23 July 1964; it celebrated its Golden Jubilee commemorating fifty years of service in 2014. The architect was Gerard Goalen and the modern design won an award from the Royal Institute of British Architects in 1966. The dalle de verre stained glass is by Patrick Reyntiens.

In 2012, the church was awarded £119,000 by English Heritage to resolve issues with concrete cancer and reinforcement decay which was eroding the fabric of the building. The roof and concrete fascia replacement cost about £300,000 despite the English Heritage grant.

Organ
The church contains a pipe organ by J. W. Walker & Sons Ltd. A specification of the organ can be found on the National Pipe Organ Register.

References

Good Shepherd
Grade II* listed churches in Nottinghamshire
Good Shepherd
Roman Catholic churches in Nottinghamshire
Roman Catholic churches completed in 1964
20th-century Roman Catholic church buildings in the United Kingdom